Cyril Casey Marcel Podd (born 7 August 1952) is a former professional footballer who played as a right-back. An international for Saint Kitts and Nevis he spent his professional career in England. He was one of the first black players to establish themselves in English football.

Club career
A student at the Bradford College of Art, Podd made his professional debut in September 1970 for Bradford City. Over the next 14 years Podd made a total of 565 appearances for City in all competitions - a club record. He signed for Halifax Town in August 1984, and later played with Scarborough – with whom he secured promotion to the Football League – and Ossett Town.

International career
Podd played internationally for Saint Kitts and Nevis.

Coaching career
Podd coached the Saint Kitts and Nevis national side between 1999 and 2002. He went on to coach the underprivileged in Leeds.

Podd is technical director of the Saint Lucia Football Association.

Outside football
Podd owns a salsa-dancing company called X-ces.

Honours
Scarborough
 Football Conference: 1986–87

References

External links
 

1952 births
Living people
People from Basseterre
Saint Kitts and Nevis footballers
Saint Kitts and Nevis international footballers
Bradford City A.F.C. players
Halifax Town A.F.C. players
Scarborough F.C. players
Ossett Town F.C. players
English Football League players
National League (English football) players
Saint Kitts and Nevis football managers
Saint Kitts and Nevis national football team managers
Association football fullbacks
Expatriate footballers in England
Saint Kitts and Nevis expatriate footballers